The list of shipwrecks in August 1878 includes ships sunk, foundered, grounded, or otherwise lost during August 1878.

1 August

2 August

3 August

4 August

5 August

6 August

7 August

8 August

10 August

12 August

13 August

14 August

15 August

16 August

17 August

18 August

19 August

20 August

22 August

23 August

24 August

25 August

26 August

{{shipwreck list item
|ship=James Drake, andWidgeon 
|flag=
|desc=The steamships collided in the River Thames and both ran aground. James Drake was on a voyage from Cronstadt, Russia to London. She was refloated and towed in to Gravesend, Kent. Widgeon was on a voyage from London to Hamburg, Germany.
}}

27 August

28 August

29 August

 

30 August

31 August

Unknown date

References

Bibliography
Ingram, C. W. N., and Wheatley, P. O., (1936) Shipwrecks: New Zealand disasters 1795–1936.'' Dunedin, NZ: Dunedin Book Publishing Association.

1878-08
Maritime incidents in August 1878